Latvia participated in the Eurovision Song Contest 2007 with the song "Questa notte" written by Kjell Jennstig, Torbjörn Wassenius and Francesca Russo. The song was performed by the group Bonaparti.lv. The Latvian broadcaster Latvijas Televīzija (LTV) organised the national final Eirodziesma 2007 in order to select the Latvian entry for the 2007 contest in Helsinki, Finland. Twenty songs were selected to compete in the national final, which consisted of three shows: two semi-finals and a final. In the semi-finals on 27 January and 3 February 2007, five entries were selected to advance from each show: three entries selected based on a public televote and two entries selected by a seven-member jury panel. Ten songs ultimately qualified to compete in the final on 1 March 2008 where two rounds of public voting selected "Questa notte" performed by Bonaparti.lv as the winner.

Latvia competed in the semi-final of the Eurovision Song Contest which took place on 10 May 2007. Performing as the closing entry during the show in position 28, "Questa notte" was announced among the top 10 entries of the semi-final and therefore qualified to compete in the final on 12 May. It was later revealed that Latvia placed fifth out of the 28 participating countries in the semi-final with 168 points. In the final, Latvia performed in position 14 and placed sixteenth out of the 24 participating countries, scoring 54 points.

Background 

Prior to the 2007 contest, Latvia had participated in the Eurovision Song Contest seven times since its first entry in 2000. Latvia won the contest once in 2002 with the song "I Wanna" performed by Marie N. Following the introduction of semi-finals for the 2004, Latvia was able to qualify to compete in the final in 2005 and 2006 including with their 2006 entry "I Hear Your Heart" performed by Vocal Group Cosmos.

The Latvian national broadcaster, Latvijas Televīzija (LTV), broadcasts the event within Latvia and organises the selection process for the nation's entry. LTV confirmed their intentions to participate at the 2007 Eurovision Song Contest on 15 September 2006. Latvia has selected their entries for the Eurovision Song Contest through a national final. Since their debut in 2000, LTV had organised the selection show Eirodziesma. Along with their participation confirmation, the broadcaster announced that they would organise Eirodziesma 2007 in order to select the Latvian entry for the 2007 contest.

Before Eurovision

Eirodziesma 2007 
Eirodziesma 2007 was the eighth edition of Eirodziesma, the music competition that selects Latvia's entries for the Eurovision Song Contest. The competition commenced on 27 January 2007 and concluded with a final on 24 February 2007. All shows in the competition were hosted by Uģis Joksts, Kristīne Virsnīte and Kārlis Streips and broadcast on LTV1.

Format 
The format of the competition consisted of three shows: two semi-finals and a final. The two semi-finals, held on 27 January and 3 February 2007, each featured ten competing entries from which five advanced to the final from each show. The final, held on 24 February 2007, selected the Latvian entry for Helsinki from the remaining ten entries over two rounds of voting: the first round selected the top three songs and the second round (superfinal) selected the winner. Results during the semi-final shows were determined by a jury panel and votes from the public. The songs first faced a public vote where the top three entries qualified. The jury then selected an additional two qualifiers from the remaining entries to proceed in the competition. In the final, a public vote exclusively determined which entry would be the winner. Viewers were able to vote via telephone or SMS.

Competing entries 
Artists and songwriters were able to submit their entries to the broadcaster between 4 October 2006 and 20 November 2006. A record 106 entries were submitted at the conclusion of the submission period, including songs in Latvian, Russian, Swedish, English, Spanish and Finnish. A jury panel appointed by LTV evaluated the submitted songs and selected twenty entries for the competition. The jury panel consisted of Wig Wam (2005 Norwegian Eurovision entrant), Zdob și Zdub (2005 Moldovan Eurovision entrant), Andrius Mamontovas (2006 Lithuanian Eurovision entrant as part of LT United), Mario Galunič (Slovenian television presenter), Cosmos (2006 Latvian Eurovision entrant), Guna Zučika (representative of MTV Baltic) and Sandris Vanzovičs (music journalist). The twenty competing artists and songs were announced during a press conference on 11 December 2006.

Shows

Semi-finals 
The two semi-finals took place on 27 January and 3 February 2007. The live portion of the show was held at the LTV studios in Riga where the artists awaited the results while their performances, which were filmed earlier at the Riga Film Studio in Riga on 18 and 20 January 2007, were screened. In each semi-final ten acts competed and five entries qualified to the final. The competing entries first faced a public vote where the top three songs advanced; an additional two qualifiers were then selected from the remaining seven entries by the jury. The jury panel that voted in the semi-finals consisted of Mirdza Zīvere (singer and director), Elita Patmalniece (costume designer), Baiba Šmite (director of LTV1), Uldis Rudaks (music journalist), Juris Kulakovs (musician), Kārlis Auzāns (producer and composer) and Mārcis Gulbis (producer).

Final 
The final took place at the Olympic Center in Ventspils on 24 February 2007. The ten entries that qualified from the preceding two semi-finals competed and the winner was selected over two rounds of public televoting. In the first round, the top three songs advanced to the second round, the superfinal. In the superfinal, "Questa notte" performed by Bonaparti.lv was declared the winner. In addition to the performances of the competing entries, guest performers included singer Jenny May together with the group Double Faced Eels, singer Ella together with the dance group Dzirnas, the group Labvēlīgais tips, 2006 Latvian Eurovision entrant Cosmos and 2007 Polish Eurovision entrant The Jet Set.

Ratings

At Eurovision 

According to Eurovision rules, all nations with the exceptions of the host country, the "Big Four" (France, Germany, Spain and the United Kingdom) and the ten highest placed finishers in the 2006 contest are required to qualify from the semi-final on 10 May 2007 in order to compete for the final on 12 May 2007. On 12 March 2007, a special allocation draw was held which determined the running order for the semi-final. As one of the five wildcard countries, Latvia chose to perform last in position 28, following the entry from Austria.

The semi-final and the final were broadcast in Latvia on LTV1 with all shows featuring commentary by Kārlis Streips. The Latvian spokesperson, who announced the Latvian votes during the final, was Jānis Šipkevics.

Semi-final 
Bonaparti.lv took part in technical rehearsals on 4 and 6 May, followed by dress rehearsals on 9 and 10 May. The Latvian performance featured the members of Bonaparti.lv wearing suits with a top hat and appearing on stage one by one carrying white roses. The stage colours were in white and gold with the LED screens displaying a set of golden rings with hints of red accompanied by bright beams of light shooting from the roof to the stage and the surrounding areas of the arena.

At the end of the show, Latvia was announced as having finished in the top 10 and subsequently qualifying for the grand final. It was later revealed that Latvia placed fifth in the semi-final, receiving a total of 188 points.

Final 
The draw for the running order for the final was done by the presenters during the announcement of the ten qualifying countries during the semi-final and Latvia was drawn to perform in position 14, following the entry from France and before the entry from Russia. Bonaparti.lv once again took part in dress rehearsals on 11 and 12 May before the final and performed a repeat of their semi-final performance during the final on 12 May. Latvia placed sixteenth in the final, scoring 54 points.

Voting 
Below is a breakdown of points awarded to Latvia and awarded by Latvia in the semi-final and grand final of the contest. The nation awarded its 12 points to Estonia in the semi-final and to Ukraine in the final of the contest.

Points awarded to Latvia

Points awarded by Latvia

References

2007
Countries in the Eurovision Song Contest 2007
Eurovision